Arik Air flies to 7 domestic destinations as of April 2021.

List

References 

Lists of airline destinations